Ana Iris Simón (born 2 June 1991) is a Spanish writer, best known for her autobiographical work Feria.

References

1991 births
Living people
21st-century Spanish women writers
21st-century Spanish writers
Writers from Castilla–La Mancha